Robert K. Massie (1929–2019) was an American historian.

Robert Massie may also refer to:

Robert George Massie (1815–1883), member of the Queensland Legislative Council
Robert Lee Massie (1941–2001), American murderer executed in California
Bob Massie (born 1947), Australian cricketer
Bob Massie (politician) (born 1956), American Episcopalian priest and politician (son of Robert K. Massie above)

See also
Robert Massey (disambiguation)